What Just Happened is a 2018 Nigerian comedy film directed by Charles Uwagbai and starring Ufuoma McDermott, Afeez Oyetoro, Segun Arinze, Toyin Abraham, Mike Ezuruonye and comedians Mc Abbey and Funny Bone. The film was written and produced by Ufuoma McDermott. The film was predominantly shot in Lagos State and Los Angeles.

Plot

A disgruntled professor Oghogho (Ufuoma McDermott) decides to return home from the US and take up a visiting lecturer position at the University of Ibadan, Oyo state suggested by her brother Efe (Segun Arinze) after she decides that she's tired of the US and cannot "get" a man over there.

Reality check is hindered by her overtly superior attitude. Upset by the driver Baba Oti (Afeez Oyetoro) and his cough, she decides to make the drive herself from Lagos to Ibadan. The would be one hour journey turns into a day of total madness and commotion as she makes lives miserable.

She gets help from a good Samaritan, Dele Lawson (Mike Ezuruonye) who then joins her on the journey to Ibadan. They get robbed, arrested, lost in a village and finally helped by Leke (Jude Orhorha). They get into more trouble when Oghogho refuses to acknowledge and respect the tradition of Leke's village.

The entire film is a story within a story, as Professor Oghogho is recounting the entire encounter as a testimony in a church, and due to time constraints, the attempt to speed up her testimony leads to more commotion.

Cast

 Ufuoma McDermott
 Omoni Oboli
 Toyin Abraham
 Mike Ezuruonye
 Mc Abbey
 Jude Orhorha
 Stanley Funnybone Chibunna
 Hafiz Oyetoro
 Segun Arinze

Production and release
Sequel to the successful cinematic run of her debut movie production Christmas is Coming in 2017, Ufuoma McDermott's sophomore movie production was released in cinemas across Nigeria on 14 September 2018. Principal photography had begun in June 2015 in Lagos and Los Angeles, while Ufuoma was pregnant. After the birth of her child on August 8, 2015, production continued in 2016 and post production was concluded in mid 2018.

Critical reception
Vanguard singled out actress Ufuoma Mcdermott's debut comedic performance for praise, stating "...after seeing ‘What just happened’, my eyes were opened to something new about her; mostly to her dynamism not just as a person, but as an actress too", however noting that "...her role in the film could have been a comic flop without the presence of one of the most admired talents to ever grace the Nigerian film industry, Toyin Abraham."

See also
 List of Nigerian films of 2018

References 

English-language Nigerian films
Nigerian comedy films
2010s English-language films